Hydrogen sulfide is a chemical compound with the formula . It is a colorless chalcogen-hydride gas, and is poisonous, corrosive, and flammable, with trace amounts in ambient atmosphere having a characteristic foul odor of rotten eggs. The underground mine gas term for foul-smelling hydrogen sulfide-rich gas mixtures is stinkdamp. Swedish chemist Carl Wilhelm Scheele is credited with having discovered the chemical composition of purified hydrogen sulfide in 1777. The British English spelling of this compound is hydrogen sulphide, a spelling no longer recommended by the Royal Society of Chemistry or the International Union of Pure and Applied Chemistry.

Hydrogen sulfide is toxic to humans and most other animals by inhibiting cellular respiration in a manner similar to hydrogen cyanide. When it is inhaled or its salts are ingested in high amounts, damage to organs occurs rapidly with symptoms ranging from breathing difficulties to convulsions and death. Despite this, the human body produces small amounts of this sulfide and its mineral salts, and uses it as a signalling molecule.

Hydrogen sulfide is often produced from the microbial breakdown of organic matter in the absence of oxygen, such as in swamps and sewers; this process is commonly known as anaerobic digestion, which is done by sulfate-reducing microorganisms. It also occurs in volcanic gases, natural gas deposits, and sometimes in well-drawn water.

Properties
Hydrogen sulfide is slightly denser than air. In general, hydrogen sulfide acts as a reducing agent, although in the presence of a base, it can act as an acid by donating a proton and forming SH−.

Hydrogen sulfide burns in oxygen with a blue flame to form sulfur dioxide and water:

 +   →  + 

If an excess of oxygen is present, sulfur trioxide is formed, which quickly hydrates to sulfuric acid:

 + 2  → 

At high temperatures or in the presence of catalysts, sulfur dioxide reacts with hydrogen sulfide to form elemental sulfur and water. This reaction is exploited in the Claus process, an important industrial method to dispose of hydrogen sulfide.

Hydrogen sulfide is slightly soluble in water and acts as a weak acid (pKa = 6.9 in 0.01–0.1 mol/litre solutions at 18 °C), giving the hydrosulfide ion  (also written ). Hydrogen sulfide and its solutions are colorless. When exposed to air, it slowly oxidizes to form elemental sulfur, which is not soluble in water. The sulfide anion  is not formed in aqueous solution.

Hydrogen sulfide reacts with metal ions to form metal sulfides, which are insoluble, often dark colored solids. Lead(II) acetate paper is used to detect hydrogen sulfide because it readily converts to lead(II) sulfide, which is black. Treating metal sulfides with strong acid or electrolysis often liberates hydrogen sulfide. Hydrogen sulfide is also responsible for tarnishing on various metals including copper and silver; the chemical responsible for black toning found on silver coins is silver sulfide (Ag2S), which is produced when the silver on the surface of the coin reacts with atmospheric hydrogen sulfide.

At pressures above 90 GPa (gigapascal), hydrogen sulfide becomes a metallic conductor of electricity. When cooled below a critical temperature this high-pressure phase exhibits superconductivity. The critical temperature increases with pressure, ranging from 23 K at 100 GPa to 150 K at 200 GPa. If hydrogen sulfide is pressurized at higher temperatures, then cooled, the critical temperature reaches , the highest accepted superconducting critical temperature as of 2015. By substituting a small part of sulfur with phosphorus and using even higher pressures, it has been predicted that it may be possible to raise the critical temperature to above  and achieve room-temperature superconductivity.

Hydrogen sulfide decomposes without a presence of a catalyst under atmospheric pressure around 1200 °C into hydrogen and sulfur.

Production
It can also be produced by treating hydrogen with molten elemental sulfur at about 450 °C. Hydrocarbons can serve as a source of hydrogen in this process.

Sulfate-reducing (resp. sulfur-reducing) bacteria generate usable energy under low-oxygen conditions by using sulfates (resp. elemental sulfur) to oxidize organic compounds or hydrogen; this produces hydrogen sulfide as a waste product.

A standard lab preparation is to treat ferrous sulfide with a strong acid in a Kipp generator:
FeS + 2 HCl → FeCl2 + H2S
For use in qualitative inorganic analysis, thioacetamide is used to generate :
CH3C(S)NH2 +  H2O   →   CH3C(O)NH2  +  H2S

Many metal and nonmetal sulfides, e.g. aluminium sulfide, phosphorus pentasulfide, silicon disulfide liberate hydrogen sulfide upon exposure to water:
6 H2O + Al2S3 → 3 H2S + 2 Al(OH)3

This gas is also produced by heating sulfur with solid organic compounds and by reducing sulfurated organic compounds with hydrogen.

Water heaters can aid the conversion of sulfate in water to hydrogen sulfide gas. This is due to providing a warm environment sustainable for sulfur bacteria and maintaining the reaction which interacts between sulfate in the water and the water heater anode, which is usually made from magnesium metal.

Biosynthesis in the body 
Hydrogen sulfide can be generated in cells via enzymatic or non-enzymatic pathways.  in the body acts as a gaseous signaling molecule which is known to inhibit Complex IV of the mitochondrial electron transport chain which effectively reduces ATP generation and biochemical activity within cells. Three enzymes are known to synthesize : cystathionine γ-lyase (CSE), cystathionine β-synthetase (CBS) and 3-mercaptopyruvate sulfurtransferase (3-MST). These enzymes have been identified in a breadth of biological cells and tissues, and their activity has been observed to be induced by a number of disease states. It is becoming increasingly clear that  is an important mediator of a wide range of cell functions in health and in diseases. CBS and CSE are the main proponents of  biogenesis, which follows the trans-sulfuration pathway. These enzymes are characterized by the transfer of a sulfur atom from methionine to serine to form a cysteine molecule. 3-MST also contributes to hydrogen sulfide production by way of the cysteine catabolic pathway. Dietary amino acids, such as methionine and cysteine serve as the primary substrates for the transulfuration pathways and in the production of hydrogen sulfide. Hydrogen sulfide can also be synthesized by non-enzymatic pathway, which is derived from proteins such as ferredoxins and Rieske proteins. There has been continuing interest in exploiting such knowledge of hydrogen sulfide's role in signaling through development of mechanistically related therapeutic agents.

Hydrogen sulfide has been shown to be involved in physiological processes such as vasodilation in animals, as well as in increasing seed germination and stress responses in plants. Hydrogen sulfide signaling is also innately intertwined with physiological processes that are known to be moderated by reactive oxygen species (ROS) and reactive nitrogen species (RNS).  has been shown to interact with NO resulting in several different cellular effects, as well as the formation of a new signal called nitrosothiol. Hydrogen sulfide is also known to increase the levels of glutathione which acts to reduce or disrupt ROS levels in cells. The field of H2S biology has advanced from environmental toxicology to investigate the roles of endogenously produced H2S in physiological conditions and in various pathophysiological states. According to a current classification, pathophysiological states with H2S overproduction (such as cancer and Down syndrome) and pathophysiological states with H2S deficit (e.g. vascular disease) can be identified. Although the understanding of H2S biology has significantly advanced over the last decade, many questions remain, for instance related to the quantification of endogenous H2S levels.

Uses

Production of sulfur, thioorganic compounds, and alkali metal sulfides
The main use of hydrogen sulfide is as a precursor to elemental sulfur. Several organosulfur compounds are produced using hydrogen sulfide. These include methanethiol, ethanethiol, and thioglycolic acid.

Upon combining with alkali metal bases, hydrogen sulfide converts to alkali hydrosulfides such as sodium hydrosulfide and sodium sulfide:
H2S  +  NaOH   →   NaSH  +  H2O
NaSH  +  NaOH   →   Na2S  +  H2O

These compounds are used in the paper making industry.  Specifically, salts of SH− break bonds between lignin and cellulose components of pulp in the Kraft process.

Reversibly sodium sulfide in the presence of acids turns into hydrosulfides and hydrogen sulfide; this supplies hydrosulfides in organic solutions and is utilized in the production of thiophenol.

Analytical chemistry
For well over a century hydrogen sulfide was important in analytical chemistry in the qualitative inorganic analysis of metal ions. In these analyses, heavy metal (and nonmetal) ions (e.g., Pb(II), Cu(II), Hg(II), As(III)) are precipitated from solution upon exposure to ). The components of the resulting precipitate redissolve with some selectivity, and are thus identified.

Precursor to metal sulfides
As indicated above, many metal ions react with hydrogen sulfide to give the corresponding metal sulfides. This conversion is widely exploited. For example, gases or waters contaminated by hydrogen sulfide can be cleaned with metals, by forming metal sulfides. In the purification of metal ores by flotation, mineral powders are often treated with hydrogen sulfide to enhance the separation. Metal parts are sometimes passivated with hydrogen sulfide. Catalysts used in hydrodesulfurization are routinely activated with hydrogen sulfide, and the behavior of metallic catalysts used in other parts of a refinery is also modified using hydrogen sulfide.

Miscellaneous applications
Hydrogen sulfide is used to separate deuterium oxide, or heavy water, from normal water via the Girdler sulfide process.

Scientists from the University of Exeter discovered that cell exposure to small amounts of hydrogen sulfide gas can prevent mitochondrial damage. When the cell is stressed with disease, enzymes are drawn into the cell to produce small amounts of hydrogen sulfide. This study could have further implications on preventing strokes, heart disease and arthritis.

Depending on the level of toning present, coins that have been subject to toning by hydrogen sulfide and other sulfur-containing compounds may add to the numismatic value of a coin based on the toning's aesthetics. Coins can also be intentionally treated with hydrogen sulfide to induce toning, though artificial toning can be distinguished from natural toning, and is generally criticised among collectors.

A suspended animation-like state has been induced in rodents with the use of hydrogen sulfide, resulting in hypothermia with a concomitant reduction in metabolic rate. Oxygen demand was also reduced, thereby protecting against hypoxia. In addition, hydrogen sulfide has been shown to reduce inflammation in various situations.

Occurrence 

MS +  → MO + . Hydrogen sulfide can be present naturally in well water, often as a result of the action of sulfate-reducing bacteria. Hydrogen sulfide is produced by the human body in small quantities through bacterial breakdown of proteins containing sulfur in the intestinal tract, therefore it contributes to the characteristic odor of flatulence. It is also produced in the mouth (halitosis).

A portion of global  emissions are due to human activity. The resulting  is converted to elemental sulfur by partial combustion via the Claus process, which is a major source of elemental sulfur. Other anthropogenic sources of hydrogen sulfide include coke ovens, paper mills (using the Kraft process), tanneries and sewerage.  arises from virtually anywhere where elemental sulfur comes in contact with organic material, especially at high temperatures. Depending on environmental conditions, it is responsible for deterioration of material through the action of some sulfur oxidizing microorganisms. It is called biogenic sulfide corrosion.

Besides living near gas and oil drilling operations, ordinary citizens can be exposed to hydrogen sulfide by being near waste water treatment facilities, landfills and farms with manure storage. Exposure occurs through breathing contaminated air or drinking contaminated water.

In municipal waste landfill sites, the burial of organic material rapidly leads to the production of anaerobic digestion within the waste mass and, with the humid atmosphere and relatively high temperature that accompanies biodegradation, biogas is produced as soon as the air within the waste mass has been reduced. If there is a source of sulfate bearing material, such as plasterboard or natural gypsum (calcium sulphate dihydrate), under anaerobic conditions sulfate reducing bacteria converts this to hydrogen sulfide. These bacteria cannot survive in air but the moist, warm, anaerobic conditions of buried waste that contains a high source of carbon – in inert landfills, paper and glue used in the fabrication of products such as plasterboard can provide a rich source of carbon – is an excellent environment for the formation of hydrogen sulfide.

In industrial anaerobic digestion processes, such as waste water treatment or the digestion of organic waste from agriculture, hydrogen sulfide can be formed from the reduction of sulfate and the degradation of amino acids and proteins within organic compounds. Sulfates are relatively non-inhibitory to methane forming bacteria but can be reduced to H2S by sulfate reducing bacteria, of which there are several genera.

Removal from water

A number of processes have been designed to remove hydrogen sulfide from drinking water.

Continuous chlorination For levels up to 75 mg/L chlorine is used in the purification process as an oxidizing chemical to react with hydrogen sulfide. This reaction yields insoluble solid sulfur. Usually the chlorine used is in the form of sodium hypochlorite.

Aeration For concentrations of hydrogen sulfide less than 2 mg/L aeration is an ideal treatment process. Oxygen is added to water and a reaction between oxygen and hydrogen sulfide react to produce odorless sulfate.

Nitrate addition Calcium nitrate can be used to prevent hydrogen sulfide formation in wastewater streams.

Removal from fuel gases
Hydrogen sulfide is commonly found in raw natural gas and biogas. It is typically removed by amine gas treating technologies.  In such processes, the hydrogen sulfide is first converted to an ammonium salt, whereas the natural gas is unaffected.
RNH2 + H2S  RNH + SH−
The bisulfide anion is subsequently regenerated by heating of the amine sulfide solution.  Hydrogen sulfide generated in this process is typically converted to elemental sulfur using the Claus Process.

Safety
Hydrogen sulfide is a highly toxic and flammable gas (flammable range: 4.3–46%). Being heavier than air, it tends to accumulate at the bottom of poorly ventilated spaces. Although very pungent at first (it smells like rotten eggs), it quickly deadens the sense of smell, creating temporary anosmia, so victims may be unaware of its presence until it is too late. Safe handling procedures are provided by its safety data sheet (SDS).

Toxicity
Hydrogen sulfide is a broad-spectrum poison, meaning that it can poison several different systems in the body, although the nervous system is most affected. It binds with iron in the mitochondrial cytochrome enzymes, thus preventing cellular respiration. Its toxic properties were described in detail in 1843 by Justus von Liebig.

Low-level exposure

Since hydrogen sulfide occurs naturally in the body, the environment, and the gut, enzymes exist to detoxify it.  At some threshold level, believed to average around 300–350 ppm, the oxidative enzymes become overwhelmed. Many personal safety gas detectors, such as those used by utility, sewage and petrochemical workers, are set to alarm at as low as 5 to 10 ppm and to go into high alarm at 15 ppm. Detoxification is effected by oxidation to sulfate, which is harmless. Hence, low levels of hydrogen sulfide may be tolerated indefinitely.

Exposure to lower concentrations can result in eye irritation, a sore throat and cough, nausea, shortness of breath, and fluid in the lungs (pulmonary edema). These effects are believed to be due to hydrogen sulfide combining with alkali present in moist surface tissues to form sodium sulfide, a caustic. These symptoms usually subside in a few weeks.

Long-term, low-level exposure may result in fatigue, loss of appetite, headaches, irritability, poor memory, and dizziness. Chronic exposure to low level  (around 2 ppm) has been implicated in increased miscarriage and reproductive health issues among Russian and Finnish wood pulp workers, but the reports have not (as of 1995) been replicated.

High-level exposure

Short-term, high-level exposure can induce immediate collapse, with loss of breathing and a high probability of death. If death does not occur, high exposure to hydrogen sulfide can lead to cortical pseudolaminar necrosis, degeneration of the basal ganglia and cerebral edema. Although respiratory paralysis may be immediate, it can also be delayed up to 72 hours.

Inhalation of H2S resulted in about 7 workplace deaths per year in the U.S. (2011–2017 data), second only to carbon monoxide (17 deaths per year) for workplace chemical inhalation deaths.

Exposure thresholds

 Exposure limits stipulated by the United States government:
10 ppm REL-Ceiling (NIOSH): recommended permissible exposure ceiling (the recommended level that must not be exceeded, except once for 10 min. in an 8-hour shift, if no other measurable exposure occurs)
20 ppm PEL-Ceiling (OSHA): permissible exposure ceiling (the level that must not be exceeded, except once for 10 min. in an 8-hour shift, if no other measurable exposure occurs)
50 ppm PEL-Peak (OSHA): peak permissible exposure (the level that must never be exceeded)
100 ppm IDLH (NIOSH): immediately dangerous to life and health (the level that interferes with the ability to escape)
 0.00047 ppm or 0.47 ppb is the odor threshold, the point at which 50% of a human panel can detect the presence of an odor without being able to identify it.
 10–20 ppm is the borderline concentration for eye irritation.
 50–100 ppm leads to eye damage.
 At 100–150 ppm the olfactory nerve is paralyzed after a few inhalations, and the sense of smell disappears, often together with awareness of danger.
 320–530 ppm leads to pulmonary edema with the possibility of death.
 530–1000 ppm causes strong stimulation of the central nervous system and rapid breathing, leading to loss of breathing.
 800 ppm is the lethal concentration for 50% of humans for 5 minutes' exposure (LC50).
 Concentrations over 1000 ppm cause immediate collapse with loss of breathing, even after inhalation of a single breath.

Treatment

Treatment involves immediate inhalation of amyl nitrite, injections of sodium nitrite, or administration of 4-dimethylaminophenol in combination with inhalation of pure oxygen, administration of bronchodilators to overcome eventual bronchospasm, and in some cases hyperbaric oxygen therapy (HBOT). HBOT has clinical and anecdotal support.

Incidents
Hydrogen sulfide was used by the British Army as a chemical weapon during World War I. It was not considered to be an ideal war gas, but, while other gases were in short supply, it was used on two occasions in 1916.

In 1975, a hydrogen sulfide release from an oil drilling operation in Denver City, Texas, killed nine people and caused the state legislature to focus on the deadly hazards of the gas. State Representative E L Short took the lead in endorsing an investigation by the Texas Railroad Commission and urged that residents be warned "by knocking on doors if necessary" of the imminent danger stemming from the gas. An exposed person may die from a second exposure to the gas, and a warning itself may be too late.

On September 2, 2005, a leak in the propeller room of a Royal Caribbean Cruise Liner docked in Los Angeles resulted in the deaths of 3 crewmen due to a sewage line leak. As a result, all such compartments are now required to have a ventilation system.

A dump of toxic waste containing hydrogen sulfide is believed to have caused 17 deaths and thousands of illnesses in Abidjan, on the West African coast, in the 2006 Côte d'Ivoire toxic waste dump.

In September 2008, three workers were killed and two suffered serious injury, including long term brain damage, at a mushroom growing company in Langley, British Columbia. A valve to a pipe that carried chicken manure, straw and gypsum to the compost fuel for the mushroom growing operation became clogged, and as workers unclogged the valve in a confined space without proper ventilation the hydrogen sulfide that had built up due to anaerobic decomposition of the material was released, poisoning the workers in the surrounding area. Investigator said there could have been more fatalities if the pipe had been fully cleared and/or if the wind had changed directions.

In 2014, levels of hydrogen sulfide as high as 83 ppm were detected at a recently built mall in Thailand called Siam Square One at the Siam Square area. Shop tenants at the mall reported health complications such as sinus inflammation, breathing difficulties and eye irritation. After investigation it was determined that the large amount of gas originated from imperfect treatment and disposal of waste water in the building.

In November 2014, a substantial amount of hydrogen sulfide gas shrouded the central, eastern and southeastern parts of Moscow. Residents living in the area were urged to stay indoors by the emergencies ministry. Although the exact source of the gas was not known, blame had been placed on a Moscow oil refinery.

In June 2016, a mother and her daughter were found deceased in their still-running 2006 Porsche Cayenne SUV against a guardrail on Florida's Turnpike, initially thought to be victims of carbon monoxide poisoning. Their deaths remained unexplained as the medical examiner waited for results of toxicology tests on the victims, until urine tests revealed that hydrogen sulfide was the cause of death. A report from the Orange-Osceola Medical Examiner's Office indicated that toxic fumes came from the Porsche's starter battery, located under the front passenger seat.

In January 2017, three utility workers in Key Largo, Florida, died one by one within seconds of descending into a narrow space beneath a manhole cover to check a section of paved street. In an attempt to save the men, a firefighter who entered the hole without his air tank (because he could not fit through the hole with it) collapsed within seconds and had to be rescued by a colleague. The firefighter was airlifted to Jackson Memorial Hospital and later recovered. A Monroe County Sheriff officer initially determined that the space contained hydrogen sulfide and methane gas produced by decomposing vegetation.

On May 24, 2018, two workers were killed, another seriously injured, and 14 others hospitalized by hydrogen sulfide inhalation at a Norske Skog paper mill in Albury, New South Wales. An investigation by SafeWork NSW found that the gas was released from a tank used to hold process water. The workers were exposed at the end of a 3-day maintenance period. Hydrogen sulfide had built up in an upstream tank, which had been left stagnant and untreated with biocide during the maintenance period. These conditions allowed sulfate-reducing bacteria to grow in the upstream tank, as the water contained small quantities of wood pulp and fiber. The high rate of pumping from this tank into the tank involved in the incident caused hydrogen sulfide gas to escape from various openings around its top when pumping was resumed at the end of the maintenance period. The area above it was sufficiently enclosed for the gas to pool there, despite not being identified as a confined space by Norske Skog. One of the workers who was killed was exposed while investigating an apparent fluid leak in the tank, while the other who was killed and the worker who was badly injured were attempting to rescue the first after he collapsed on top of it. In a resulting criminal case, Norske Skog was accused of failing to ensure the health and safety of its workforce at the plant to a reasonably practicable extent. It plead guilty, and was fined AU$1,012,500 and ordered to fund the production of an anonymized educational video about the incident.

In October 2019, an Odessa, Texas employee of Aghorn Operating Inc. and his wife were killed due to a water pump failure. Produced water with a high concentration of hydrogen sulfide was released by the pump. The worker died while responding to an automated phone call he had received alerting him to a mechanical failure in the pump, while his wife died after driving to the facility to check on him. A CSB investigation cited lax safety practices at the facility, such as an informal lockout-tagout procedure and a nonfunctioning hydrogen sulfide alert system.

Suicides
The gas, produced by mixing certain household ingredients, was used in a suicide wave in 2008 in Japan. The wave prompted staff at Tokyo's suicide prevention center to set up a special hotline during "Golden Week", as they received an increase in calls from people wanting to kill themselves during the annual May holiday.

As of 2010, this phenomenon has occurred in a number of US cities, prompting warnings to those arriving at the site of the suicide. These first responders, such as emergency services workers or family members are at risk of death or injury from inhaling the gas, or by fire. Local governments have also initiated campaigns to prevent such suicides.

In 2020, H2S ingestion was used as a suicide method by Japanese pro wrestler Hana Kimura.

Hydrogen sulfide in the natural environment

Microbial: The sulfur cycle

Hydrogen sulfide is a central participant in the sulfur cycle, the biogeochemical cycle of sulfur on Earth.

In the absence of oxygen, sulfur-reducing and sulfate-reducing bacteria derive energy from oxidizing hydrogen or organic molecules by reducing elemental sulfur or sulfate to hydrogen sulfide. Other bacteria liberate hydrogen sulfide from sulfur-containing amino acids; this gives rise to the odor of rotten eggs and contributes to the odor of flatulence.

As organic matter decays under low-oxygen (or hypoxic) conditions (such as in swamps, eutrophic lakes or dead zones of oceans), sulfate-reducing bacteria will use the sulfates present in the water to oxidize the organic matter, producing hydrogen sulfide as waste. Some of the hydrogen sulfide will react with metal ions in the water to produce metal sulfides, which are not water-soluble. These metal sulfides, such as ferrous sulfide FeS, are often black or brown, leading to the dark color of sludge.

Several groups of bacteria can use hydrogen sulfide as fuel, oxidizing it to elemental sulfur or to sulfate by using dissolved oxygen, metal oxides (e.g., iron oxyhydroxides and manganese oxides), or nitrate as electron acceptors.

The purple sulfur bacteria and the green sulfur bacteria use hydrogen sulfide as an electron donor in photosynthesis, thereby producing elemental sulfur. This mode of photosynthesis is older than the mode of cyanobacteria, algae, and plants, which uses water as electron donor and liberates oxygen.

The biochemistry of hydrogen sulfide is a key part of the chemistry of the iron-sulfur world. In this model of the origin of life on Earth, geologically produced hydrogen sulfide is postulated as an electron donor driving the reduction of carbon dioxide.

Animals
Hydrogen sulfide is lethal to most animals, but a few highly specialized species (extremophiles) do thrive in habitats that are rich in this compound.

In the deep sea, hydrothermal vents and cold seeps with high levels of hydrogen sulfide are home to a number of extremely specialized lifeforms, ranging from bacteria to fish. Because of the absence of sunlight at these depths, these ecosystems rely on chemosynthesis rather than photosynthesis.

Freshwater springs rich in hydrogen sulfide are mainly home to invertebrates, but also include a small number of fish: Cyprinodon bobmilleri (a pupfish from Mexico), Limia sulphurophila (a poeciliid from the Dominican Republic), Gambusia eurystoma (a poeciliid from Mexico), and a few Poecilia (poeciliids from Mexico). Invertebrates and microorganisms in some cave systems, such as Movile Cave, are adapted to high levels of hydrogen sulfide.

Interstellar and planetary occurrence
Hydrogen sulfide has often been detected in the interstellar medium.  It also occurs in the clouds of planets in our solar system.

Mass extinctions

Hydrogen sulfide has been implicated in several mass extinctions that have occurred in the Earth's past. In particular, a buildup of hydrogen sulfide in the atmosphere may have caused, or at least contributed to, the Permian-Triassic extinction event 252 million years ago.

Organic residues from these extinction boundaries indicate that the oceans were anoxic (oxygen-depleted) and had species of shallow plankton that metabolized .  The formation of  may have been initiated by massive volcanic eruptions, which emitted carbon dioxide and methane into the atmosphere, which warmed the oceans, lowering their capacity to absorb oxygen that would otherwise oxidize . The increased levels of hydrogen sulfide could have killed oxygen-generating plants as well as depleted the ozone layer, causing further stress.  Small  blooms have been detected in modern times in the Dead Sea and in the Atlantic ocean off the coast of Namibia.

See also

Hydrogen sulfide chemosynthesis

Marsh gas

References

Additional resources

External links

 International Chemical Safety Card 0165
 Concise International Chemical Assessment Document 53
 National Pollutant Inventory - Hydrogen sulfide fact sheet
 NIOSH Pocket Guide to Chemical Hazards
 NACE (National Association of Corrosion Epal)

Acids
Foul-smelling chemicals
Hydrogen compounds
Triatomic molecules
Industrial gases
Airborne pollutants
Sulfides
Flatulence
Gaseous signaling molecules
Blood agents